Tafuna is a village on the east coast of Tutuila Island, American Samoa. It is home to Pago Pago International Airport (Tafuna Airport). It is one mile south of Nu'uuli, American Samoa. The Ottoville district is a part of Tafuna. Near the Catholic church at Ottoville is an archeological park containing a well-preserved ancient Polynesian mound as well as a rainforest reserve. Tafuna is located on the Tafuna Plain, which is the largest flatland on the island of Tutuila.
 
Tafuna is the most populous village in American Samoa, with a population of 7,988 according to the 2020 U.S. Census, and is the center of nightlife on the island. The Cathedral of the Holy Family (1986) located in the village is the episcopal see of the Roman Catholic Diocese of Samoa–Pago Pago.

Tafuna is home to several park areas operated by American Samoa Parks and Recreation, including Lions Park, Tia Seu Lupe and Tony Sola'ita Baseball Field. Solaita Baseball Field is named after Tony Solaita, the first American Samoan to play in Major League Baseball. He was murdered in Tafuna in 1990.

Tafuna consists of several subdivisions: Fagaima, Kokoland, Ottoville, Happy Valley, and Petesa. The area around Tafuna Airport is known as Tafunafou, meaning "New Tafuna".

Geography

The village of Tafuna is located on the Tafuna Plain, a Holocene era 8.9 sq. mi. volcanic plain on Tutuila Island. Besides the plateau at A’oloaufou, the Leone-Tafuna Plain is the only major flat land on Tutuila Island. Late-stage volcanic eruptions formed the large flat plain. It is the largest flatland on the island. It is also the principal area for the development of housing and industry in American Samoa. It is one of the places in American Samoa where the most freehold land is found. Public utilities, the international airport, and light industry are based on the Tafuna Plain. A rainforest reserve can be found in the Ottoville subdivision of Tafuna.

The village consists of three main sections: Industrial Park, Lion's Park, and Ottoville.

Demographics

The population in American Samoa doubled in from 1978 to 1997. Most of this population growth took place on the Tafuna Plain and in the Pago Pago area. Nearly all of American Samoa's commercial development lies in the perimeter around Pago Pago and on the Tafuna Plain, which is the largest area of flatland on Tutuila Island.

As of the 2020 U.S. Census, Tafuna has more housing units than any other village in American Samoa, at 1,914 units.

Economic activity

Tafuna consists of the largest concentration of businesses in American Samoa. As one of the few places in American Samoa that allow for the private purchase of land, Tafuna has become the largest village in American Samoa and a melting pot of residents with different nationalities. Tafuna International Airport (Pago Pago Airport) is located in Tafuna. The construction of an airport at the Tafuna Plain was one of the major consequences of the military buildup in the early 1940s. Bulldozers were used to scrape away and clear a thick jungle, and explosives were later utilized to blast away obstructions and fill underwater areas. In March 1942, the main runway at Tafuna was constructed. It was 200 feet wide and 3,600 feet long and available to use for the first Marine Air Group's arrival.

The first airplanes of Marine Air Group 13 landed at the nearly finished Tafuna Air Base on April 2, 1942. The area surrounding the airstrip was primitive and difficult, mostly consisting of dense jungle. Four days after the air group's arrival, the first runway at Tafuna was constructed by the Utah Construction Company with assistance from the Marine Corps. The Tafuna Airstrip was 2,500 feet long and 250 feet wide. On July 18, 1962, the first jet-plane, Pan Am Boeing 707, arrived at Tafuna International Airport, carrying Stewart Udall, the Secretary of the Interior.

Pago Pago International Airport has the headquarters of Inter Island Airways. Tafuna contains the location of the headquarters of Island Choice Factory, along with The Tradewinds Hotel and a Cost U Less supermarket. Kanana Fou Private School was built in the village in 1979 for the Congregational Christian Church in American Samoa.

Tradewinds Hotel on Main Ottoville Road in Ottoville has a day spa, resort pool, tour desk, and ATM. It is also the home of Equator Restaurant where shows such as fiafia performances are held Friday nights. The hotel was built in 2003. Other hotels in Tafuna are Maliu Mai Beach Resort and Pago Airport Inn, which is a motel-style inn with a restaurant and swimming pool.

Tafuna Industrial Park (TIP), also known as Senator Daniel K. Inouye Industrial Park, is operated through the Department of Commerce and its Tafuna Industrial Park Panel. TIP is located on a 100-acre lot near Tafuna Airport.

A modern prison was built near the Tafuna Airport for 28 inmates in 1970. In September 2016, a new Tafuna government prison opened. The prison was built for male prisoners at a cost of approximately $4 million.

Religion
The Christian Church of American Samoa (CCCAS) made plans to construct a church center in Tafuna in 1982. The first phase of the construction of the center, which was named Kanana Fou, was completed by 1984. In 1997 a multimillion-dollar gymnasium and athletic facility was completed. Kanama Fou had now become a large religious center for seminars, conferences, athletic- and youth activities, and many more community uses. Tafuna also became the center of American Samoa's Catholic Church. Construction began on the cathedral, church hall, dormitories, and other support buildings in the 1980s and 1990s. Construction of the new complex, known as Fatu O Aiga, was completed at the cost of $3 million.
The Holy Family Cathedral at Fatuoaiga has a display of wood-carvings by artist Sven Ortquist.

Education
Tafuna High School is the largest, most urban, and also the most cosmopolitan high school in American Samoa. It opened in 1982 with a total of 100 enrolled students. It is the newest of the five public high schools in American Samoa and has 1,200 enrolled students as of 2018. The high school's football team practices on a rippled grass expanse in the center of the high school campus. The Tafuna Warriors football team experienced a championship streak from 2011 to 2013 in the American Samoa High School Athletics Association (ASHSAA) football. The team also claimed both the 2018 Varsity and Junior Varsity championship titles, with undefeated records in both divisions. The Warriors have now clinched both the 2020 Varsity and Junior Varsity championship titles with undefeated records, the latter being Tafuna's 3-peat streak.
Tafuna is home to the most accessible of American Samoa's star mounds, known as Tia Seu Lupe. This can be seen right behind the statue of St. Mary near the large Catholic cathedral. The name literally translates to "earthen mound to catch pigeons." The star mound is almost ten feet high and is one of the best-preserved mounds on the island. It is believed to have been used in rituals by tribal chiefs to capture pigeons for an unknown rite. Similar step-stone mounds can be found throughout Polynesia.

The Holy Family Catholic Cathedral from 1994 is situated at the Ottoville district on the Tafuna Plain. It contains a picture of the Holy Family on a Samoan beach painted by Duffy Sheridan in 1991. Samoan artist Sven Ortquist did the fourteen deep-relief Stations of the Cross and other woodcarvings and also designed the stained glass windows. Adjacent to the Fatuoaiga Catholic Church Center is a historic park with restored tia seu lupe (a pigeon-catching mound) that resembles the later marae of Eastern Polynesia. The park is located next to the only part of low-land rainforest still found on Tutuila Island.

Lions Park sits along the Pala Lagoon in Tafuna and is a public park under the jurisdiction of American Samoa Government Parks and Recreation. Recreational use of Pala Lagoon is centered around Lions Park. The park is home to picnic tables, tennis courts, and a children's playground. Canoes, rafts, and kayaks are launched from the park. The Pala Lagoon Swimming Center is a community swimming pool at Lions Park which was built in 2017. Pala Lagoon Swim Center has three swimming pools, water slides, and a splash pad. Next to the swim center is Lion's Park, which consists of tennis courts, a playground, a basketball court, and volleyball nets. There are also several fales with grills and picnic tables.

Landmarks
Veterans Memorial Stadium
Cathedral of the Holy Family
Tradewinds Hotel
Lions Park
Tia Seu Lupe historical site at Fatuoaiga
Tony Sola'ita Baseball Field

Notable people
 Jonathan Fanene, former NFL player
 Frankie Luvu, NFL player
 Junior Siavii, former NFL player
 Destiny Vaeao, NFL player
 Tony Solaita, MLB player, killed at Tafuna

References

External links
 GCatolic - Samoa-Pago Pago diocese

 
Tutuila
Villages in American Samoa